The Sudan plated lizard (Broadleysaurus major), also known as the western plated lizard, great plated lizard, or Broadley's rough-scaled plated lizard, is a medium-sized, diurnal African lizard.

Description

The Sudan plated lizard is a medium-sized lizard that can grow up to 20-24" long, with the tail being less than half of total length. They have stout bodies, short limbs, and moderately broad tails.

This species is easily recognised by its heavily armored appearance. The body and tail is covered in transverse bands of more or less square plate-like keeled scales, and head shields are fused to the skull. The armour makes the animals look a bit like the uncommon perception of Mesozoic reptiles.

Coloration varies from tawny to grayish brown to dark brown with cream-colored spots or striping, with a pale underside. Males tend to be larger than females, and can develop bright-colored throats during breeding season.

Distribution

The Sudan plated lizard can be found in parts of eastern and central Africa, including the countries Tanzania (including the island archipelago of Zanzibar), Kenya and Mozambique. They prefer rocky, semi-open areas within coastal woodland, thicket, moist savannah, and dry savannah habitats. They seem to especially prefer rock piles and crevices.

Diet 
Sudan plated lizards are omnivores. Although they primarily eat insects, they also occasionally eat fruits, vegetation, and small vertebrates like small lizards and rodents. They also like fruits and vegetables in their diet.

Captivity

Plated lizards are typically very shy, but they are docile and can tame quickly with regular handling.

Individuals require a terrarium with dimensions of at least 48"L x 24"W x 24"H, with bedding that allows them to dig and burrow. The enclosure should offer plenty of hiding places to help them feel secure.

The enclosure must have a daytime temperature of 70-85 °F, with a localized basking area with temperatures between 105 and 115 °F as measured by a digital probe thermometer or infrared thermometer. The enclosure should be allowed to cool down at night, but should not get colder than 60 °F. Sudan plated lizards should also be provided with a high quality T5 HO (desert) UVB lamp half the length of the enclosure and placed on the same side as the heat lamp. Although they are a fairly arid species, they do best when they have access to areas of higher humidity, up to 80%.

Sudan plated lizards will eat live crickets, dubia roaches, and other insects. For vegetation, they will take leafy greens such as collard greens, mustard greens, endive, escarole and spring mix, as well as carrots and grated sweet potato. Fruits such as mango pieces and berries can be used as treats. Citrus fruit (e.g. orange) and other acidic fruits should be avoided as this can cause stomach ulcers and digestion problems. Some keepers also treat their plated lizards with the occasional small pinkie mouse, depending on the size of the individual. A bowl of clean, fresh water should always be available.

Classification
Subspecies Broadleysaurus major

Broadleysaurus major major  
Broadleysaurus major bottegoi

References

External links

Gerrhosauridae
Reptiles described in 1851
Taxa named by Auguste Duméril